The Italian Workers' Party (Partito Operaio Italiano, POI) was a socialist political party in Italy.

It was founded in 1882 in Milan by Giuseppe Croce and Costantino Lazzari and was supported externally by the Milanese Socialist League of Filippo Turati. In 1892 the party was merged with the Italian Revolutionary Socialist Party of Andrea Costa and the Socialist League to form the Italian Socialist Party, led by Filippo Turati.

In 1892 the party joined the new "Party of Italian Workers" (Partito dei Lavoratori Italiani), which changed its name in 1893 to "Socialist Party of Italian Workers" (Partito Socialista dei Lavoratori Italiani) and in 1895 to Italian Socialist Party (Partito Socialista Italiano).

References

1882 establishments in Italy
1892 disestablishments in Italy
Defunct political parties in Italy
Defunct socialist parties in Italy
Political parties disestablished in 1892
Political parties established in 1882